George VII or 7 may refer to:
 
 George VII of Georgia (died 1405 or 1407)
 George VII of Imereti (died 1720)

See also
 Prince George of Wales (born 2013), possible future regnal name
 King George (disambiguation)
 Charles III, who was reported to have considered George VII as a regnal name; this was later denied.

References